The 1938 Maryland gubernatorial election was held on November 8, 1938. Democratic nominee Herbert O'Conor defeated incumbent Republican Harry Nice with 54.62% of the vote.

Primary elections
Primary elections were held on September 12, 1938.

Democratic primary

Candidates
Herbert O'Conor, Attorney General of Maryland
Howard W. Jackson, Mayor of Baltimore
William S. Gordy Jr., Comptroller of Maryland
Lansdale Ghiselin Sasscer, State Delegate

Results

Republican primary

Candidates
Harry Nice, incumbent Governor
Harry T. Phoebus, former State Senator

Results

General election

Candidates
Major party candidates
Herbert O'Conor, Democratic
Harry Nice, Republican 

Other candidates
Herbert Brune, Independent
Joshua C. Gwin, Union
David W. Eyman, Socialist
Robert Kadish, Independent
Samuel Gordon, Communist

Results

References

1938
Maryland
Gubernatorial